The Dead Line is a 1920 American silent drama film directed by Dell Henderson and starring George Walsh,  Irene Boyle and Virginia Valli.

Synopsis
Two families living a hard life in the mountains have a long-standing feud. When one of the younger members of one family refuses to continue the fight, he is branded a coward, but comes to the rescue of a young woman of the opposing family when she is threatened by a moonshiner.

Cast
 George Walsh as 	Clay Boone
 Irene Boyle as Mollie Powell
 Baby Anita Lopez as 'Bebe' Boone
 Joe Henaway as 	David Boone 
 Al Hart as Lem Harlan
 Henry W. Pemberton as 	Zeke Harlan
 James Milady as 	Dan Harlan
 Gus Weinberg as Judge Ramsey
 G.A. Stryker as 	Dwight Weston
 Virginia Valli as 	Julia Weston
 James Birdsong as 	Hamilton Weston
 Jack Hopkins as 	Buck Gomery

References

Bibliography
 Connelly, Robert B. The Silents: Silent Feature Films, 1910-36, Volume 40, Issue 2. December Press, 1998.
 Munden, Kenneth White. The American Film Institute Catalog of Motion Pictures Produced in the United States, Part 1. University of California Press, 1997.
 Solomon, Aubrey. The Fox Film Corporation, 1915-1935: A History and Filmography. McFarland, 2011.

External links
 

1920 films
1920 drama films
1920s English-language films
American silent feature films
Silent American drama films
American black-and-white films
Films directed by Dell Henderson
Fox Film films
1920s American films